William McLean McFarlane (March 30, 1930 – June 28, 2020) was a professional Canadian football end who played for the Toronto Argonauts. He was drafted first overall in the 1954 CFL Draft by the Argonauts.

References

Toronto Argonauts players
1930 births
Sportspeople from Hamilton, Ontario
2020 deaths